Roadflower (also known as Road Flower  or The Road Killers) is a 1994 American suspense thriller starring Christopher Lambert, Craig Sheffer, Michelle Forbes, Joseph Gordon-Levitt, David Arquette, Josh Brolin, Christopher McDonald, John Pyper-Ferguson and Adrienne Shelly.

Plot
Jack Lerolland (Christopher Lambert), his brother Glen (Christopher McDonald) and family and friends go for a short country trip. When young Rich Lerolland (Joseph Gordon-Levitt) is nearly run down, his father takes off after the car that was involved. The driver, a psychopath named Cliff (Craig Sheffer) leads a gang of thugs. When Cliff kills Jack's brother in a car crash, this is the start of the chain of events which will terrorize the Lerolland family. With the female members of the group being molested and Jack thought to be killed, the other members of Cliff's gang go to their hideout.

Meanwhile, Jack is revived and is able to travel to a police station but is thrown into a cell and told to wait there, while the on-duty officer goes to check out the gang's hideout. The police officer arrives later at the hideout but is shot dead by a surprised Cliff. After this incident, Cliff becomes suspicious of some of his gang members and kills one of them. At the station, Jack and Hauser (John Pyper-Ferguson), Cliff's older brother break out and are free. Jack is tricked by Hauser into waiting at the station, while Hauser takes the police car. Jack subsequently takes another car and reaches the hideout to free his friends and family.

Cliff has already escaped the hideout with Hauser and Jack's daughter. Cliff says he can't remember killing their mother, and Hauser confesses being the murderer. Cliff murders Hauser for having Cliff take the blame for years. They continue to evade police capture, until they reach a major railway crossing. Jack who has been following Cliff, chases him onto the other side of the crossing and a fight ensues, with Jack gaining the upper hand and handcuffing Cliff to his car. Jack then moves the car onto one of the tracks and leaves it to be smashed by an approaching train, perishing Cliff.

Cast

 Christopher Lambert as Jack Lerolland
 Craig Sheffer as Cliff
 David Arquette as Bobby
 Josh Brolin as Tom
 John Pyper-Ferguson as Hauser
 Joseph Gordon-Levitt as Rich Lerolland
 Michael Greene as Sheriff Hodes
 Christopher McDonald as Glen Lerolland
 Michelle Forbes as Helen Lerolland
 Alexondra Lee as Ashley Lerolland
 Adrienne Shelly as Red
 George Salazar as Milo
 Paulo Tocha as Officer Garcia
 Ernest Smith as Officer Cortez
 Jack Rader as Deputy Wilcox 
 Joe La Due as Majestic
 Pamela Gordon as  Clerk
 Patrick Thompson as Local
 Richard C. Sarafian Jr. as Shaller
 Richard Sarafian as Trucker

See also 
Hot Rods To Hell

References

External links

1994 crime thriller films
American independent films
1994 films
Films directed by Deran Sarafian
Miramax films
Dimension Films films
1994 independent films
1990s English-language films
1990s American films